Kunthavai Naacchiyaar Government Arts College for Women (Autonomous) is an arts & science institution in Thanjavur, Tamil Nadu, India. The institution is affiliated to Bharathidasan University, Tiruchirappalli.

It was founded in 1966 by Government of Tamil Nadu. It was started with name of Government Arts College in the ancient seat of learning of Tamil culture.  It was upgraded in 1969 and in 1970 it was shifted to the present premises of 17.9 acre. It was  recognized by the UGC (12B and 2f) in 1972. In 1984 the college was renamed as Kunthavai Naacchiyaar Government Arts College.

The Institution had reached another milestone in 2000 when the NACC team visited and  accredited the college  with Three Star Status. In the year 2004 the autonomous status was conferred to the college. In 2006 the institution was re-accredited with B+ grade by the NAAC.

Undergraduate courses

Arts courses
 B.A Tamil Literature 
 B.A Economics
 B.A English Literature
 B.A History
 B.Com
 B.B.A (Retail Management)
 B.Sc Computer science

Science courses
 B.Sc Botany
 B.Sc Chemistry
 B.Sc Computer Science
 B.Sc Mathematics
 B.Sc Physics
 B.Sc Zoology

Post graduate courses

Arts courses
 M.A. Economics
 M.A. Tamil Literature
 M.A. English Literature
 M.Com
 M.A. History

Science courses
 M.Sc Botany
 M.Sc Chemistry
 M.Sc Mathematics
 M.Sc Physics
 M.Sc Zoology
 M.Sc Computer Science

External links
website

References

Education in Thanjavur
Educational institutions established in 1966
1966 establishments in Madras State
Colleges affiliated to Bharathidasan University